Shawnee Expressway may refer to:
Shawnee Expressway (Kentucky)
Shawnee Expressway (West Virginia)